Monique Pinçon-Charlot  (born 15 May 1946, in Saint-Étienne, France) is a French sociologist, research director at the French National Centre for Scientific Research (CNRS) until 2007, year of her retiring, attached to the Research Institute on Contemporary Societies/ l'Institut de recherche sur les sociétés contemporaines (IRESCO).

She works generally in collaboration with her husband Michel Pinçon, also a sociologist; they coauthored the majority of their works. These treat the closing within the upper classes of the society, through themes such as the homogamy or the social norms.

Works

Co-authored with different colleagues
 Introduction à l'étude de la planification urbaine en région parisienne—Introduction to the Study of Urban Planning in the Region of Paris-- (with Edmond Preteceille), Paris : Centre de sociologie urbaine, 1973.
 Les Conditions d'exploitation de la force de travail—Conditions for Workforce Exploitation-- (with Michel Freyssenet et François Imbert), Paris : Centre de sociologie urbaine, 1975.
 Les Modalités de reproduction de la force de travail—Reproduction Modes of the workforce-- (with Michel Freyssenet et François Imbert), Paris : Centre de sociologie urbaine, 1975.
 Équipements collectifs, structures urbaines et consommation sociale—Shared Equipment, Urban Structures and Social Consumption-- (with Edmond Preteceille et Paul Rendu), Paris : Centre de sociologie urbaine, 1975.
 Espace social et espace culturel. Analyse de la distribution socio-spatiale des équipements culturels et éducatifs en région parisienne—Social space and Cultural Space: Analysis of the Socio-spatial Distribution of Educational and Cultural Equipment in the Paris Region (with Paul de Gaudemar), Paris : Centre de sociologie urbaine, 1979.
 Espace des équipements collectifs et ségrégation sociale—Shared Equipment and Social Segregation-- (with Paul Rendu), Paris : Centre de sociologie urbaine, 1981. 
 Ségrégation urbaine (with Paul Rendu et Edmond Preteceille), Paris : Anthropos, 1986.
 Des sociologues sans qualités ? Pratiques de recherche et engagements, --Sociologists Without Qualities? ReseaRch and Engagement Practices—edited by Delphine Naudier et Maud Simonet, Paris, La Découverte, 2011. 
 Altergouvernement (ouvrage collectif), Le Muscadier, 2012.().

With Michel Pinçon
 Dans les beaux quartiers, --In Good Neighborhoods—Paris Seuil, coll. « L'Épreuve des faits », 1989.
 Quartiers bourgeois, quartiers d'affaires, --Bourgeois Neighborhoods, Business Neighborhoods—Paris : Payot, coll. « Documents Payot », 1992.
 La Chasse à courre. Ses rites et ses enjeux, Paris : Payot, coll. « Documents Payot », 1993.
 Réédition coll. « Petite bibliothèque Payot », 2003.
 Grandes Fortunes. Dynasties familiales et formes de richesse en France, Paris : Payot, coll. « Documents Payot », 1996. 
 Réédition augmentée coll. « Petite bibliothèque Payot », 2006.
 Réédition coll. « Petite bibliothèque Payot », 1998.
 Voyage en grande bourgeoisie, Paris : Presses universitaires de France, coll. « Sciences sociales et sociétés », 1997. 
 Réédition coll. « Quadrige » n°380, 2002. Réédition actualisée 2005.
 Les Rothschild. Une famille bien ordonnée, Paris : La Dispute, 1998.
 Nouveaux patrons, nouvelles dynasties, Paris : Calmann-Lévy, 1999.
 Sociologie de la bourgeoisie, Paris : La Découverte, coll. « Repères » n°294, 2000. Rééditions actualisées 2003 et 2007.
 Paris mosaïque. Promenades urbaines, Paris : Calmann-Lévy, 2001.
 Paris. Quinze promenades sociologiques, Paris : Payot, 2009. Réédition fortement remaniée.
 Réédition coll. « Petite bibliothèque Payot » n°926, 2013.
 Le Cas Pinochet. Justice et politique, Paris : Syllepse, coll. « Arguments-Mouvements », 2003.
 Sociologie de Paris, Paris : La Découverte, coll. « Repères » n°400, 2004. Réédition actualisée 2008.
 Châteaux et châtelains. Les siècles passent, le symbole demeure, Paris : Anne Carrière, 2005.
 Les Ghettos du gotha. Comment la bourgeoisie défend ses espaces, Paris : Seuil, 2007. 
 Réédition Paris : Points, 2010.
 Les Millionnaires de la chance. Rêve et réalité, Paris : Payot, 2010.
 Réédition coll. « Petite bibliothèque Payot » n°836, 2011.
 Le Président des riches. Enquête sur l'oligarchie dans la France de Nicolas Sarkozy, Paris : La Découverte, 2010. 
 Réédition augmentée coll. « La Découverte Poche. Essais » n°353, 2011.
 L'Argent sans foi ni loi, Paris : Éditions Textuel, 2012. 
 La violence des riches - Chronique d'une immense casse sociale, Zones, 2013.
 Riche, pourquoi pas toi ?, mis en bande dessinée par Marion Montaigne, Paris : Dargaud, 2013.
 Pourquoi les riches sont-ils de plus en plus riches et les pauvres de plus en plus pauvres ?, illustré par Etienne Lécroart, Paris, La Ville Brûle, 2014.
 C'est quoi être riche ? Entretiens avec Emile, illustré par Pascal Lemaître, Paris, Edition de l'Aube, 2015.  
 Tentative d'évasion (fiscale), Zones, 2015.
 Le Président des ultra-riches. Chronique du mépris de classe dans la politique d'Emmanuel Macron, Paris, Zones, 2019.
 Notre vie chez les riches. Mémoires d'un couple de sociologues, Paris, Zones, 2021.

See also

 Bourgeoisie

References

1946 births
Living people
Chevaliers of the Légion d'honneur
French sociologists
French women sociologists
People from Saint-Étienne
Research directors of the French National Centre for Scientific Research